Nelson Borges may refer to:

 Nélson Borges (footballer, born 1955), Brazilian football player
 Nelson Borges (footballer, born 1992), Portuguese football player